Samuel Peters (1835 – September 26, 1873) was an American businessman and politician from Louisiana. A Republican, he was elected to the United States House of Representatives for Louisiana's 4th congressional district in 1872 but died from complications caused by Yellow fever shortly before he was due to take office. If Peters had lived long enough to have officially taken office, he would have been the first African American elected to the United States House of Representatives from Louisiana.

Career
Samuel Peters was born in 1835 in Ohio. Peters became one of the first African Americans to attend Liber College in Jay County, Indiana. While in Ohio, Peters became a principal for a school for African Americans in Dayton and additionally was a part of a group of African American voters who were turned away while trying to vote in Dayton. In 1871, Peters moved to Shreveport, Louisiana and was appointed as the cashier for the local branch of the Freedman's Bank, which sought to provide financial aid for previously enslaved people in the South. Governor P. B. S. Pinchback also appointed Peters to the position of division superintendent of education. Despite these job posts, Peters contemplated returning to Ohio in fear of his safety but the Louisiana Republican Party reaffirmed his stay in Louisiana by nominating him for Louisiana's 4th congressional district in 1862. Peters won the election in 1862, garnering 64% of the vote. However, due to a tumultuous year in the executive position for Louisiana politics, Peters was forced to continue his job as a cashier for the Freedman's bank until such a time was appropriate when he could be elected. Tragically, less than a month and a half before he was set to be sworn in for the 43rd Louisiana Congress, Peters contracted Yellow Fever which had spread through Shreveport, and died on September 26, 1873. A special election took place to fill Peters' role, and Republican George Luke Smith was elected.

References

1835 births
1873 deaths